is a 2001 fighting game developed by Genki and Lightweight for the Xbox. It was published by Crave Entertainment in North America and Genki in Japan. One of the Xbox's earliest exclusive titles, the game received negative reviews.

Reception

The game received "unfavorable" reviews according to video game review aggregator Metacritic. It is considered one of the worst video games of all time. Complaints were directed towards a lack of variety between characters and environments, dreadful graphics, a very limited move set, and only utilizing one button for attacks. GameSpot gave it the distinction of being named "Worst Game of 2001".

Edge, giving the game its first one-out-of-ten rating in the publication's history, described it in this way: "This isn't kabuki. It's Yie Ar Kung-Fu with blusher." Andy McNamara of Game Informer said, "Quite frankly, this game is a joke. The fighters you face early on are so easy to beat, I literally won a match just bashing the controller against my ass. I wish I was joking, but the score is seriously Kabuki Warriors zero, my ass one. Some of the warriors are cool to look at with all their elaborate garb and authentic dance, but the fighting is pathetic." NextGen called it "a good example of a really bad fighting game." In Japan, Famitsu gave it a score of 20 out of 40.

References

External links

2001 video games
Crave Entertainment games
Fighting games
Genki (company) games
Kabuki
Multiplayer and single-player video games
Video games developed in Japan
Video games scored by Takayuki Nakamura
Xbox games
Xbox-only games
Lightweight (company) games